The Battle of Britain was a Second World War campaign in which the German Luftwaffe and British Royal Air Force fought for air superiority.

Battle of Britain or Battle for Britain may also refer to:

Video games
 Battle of Britain (video game), a 1987 video game
 Their Finest Hour: The Battle of Britain, a 1989 video game
 Rowan's Battle of Britain, a 2000 video game

Other uses
 Battle of Britain (film), a 1969 film by Guy Hamilton
 The Battle of Britain, a 1943 propaganda film by Frank Capra
 Battle for Britain (Private Eye), a Private Eye comic strip
 Battle of Britain class, a class steam locomotives formerly used on railways in southern England
 Lennox Lewis vs. Frank Bruno or Battle of Britain, a 1993 boxing match
 Carl Froch vs. George Groves or Battle of Britain, a 2013 boxing match

See also
 Anglo-Saxon invasion of Britain from the 5th to 7th centuries
 Caesar's invasions of Britain in  43 BC  
 Invasion of England
 List of wars involving Britain
 Roman conquest of Britain Starting in 44 AD and ending in 96 AD